Tegula patagonica is a species of sea snail, a marine gastropod mollusk in the family Tegulidae.

Description
The size of the shell varies between 10 mm and 21 mm. The thick, umbilicate shell has an orbiculate-conical shape. It is transversely narrowly granulose-sulcate. It has a uniform brownish or purplish color. The spire is conic. The apex is obtuse. The five whorls are subcarinate with sutures excavated. The  aperture is rounded. The columella is bidentate.

Distribution
This marine species occurs from Southern Brazil to Southern Chile at depths between 0 m and 57 m.

References

 Philippi, R. A. 1843. Trochus. Abbildungen und Beschreibungen neuer oder wenig gekannter Conchylien 1(2-3): 31-34, 65-69, pl. 1-2
 Pilsbry, H. A. 1900. Species of Chlorostoma of Southern and Eastern Patagonia. Nautilus 13: 110-112
 Ihering, H. von. 1907. Les Mollusques fossiles du Tertiare et du Crétacé Supérieur de l'Argentine. Anales del Museo Nacional de Buenos Aires (3)7: xiii + 611 pp., 18 pls
 Dall, W. H. 1927. Diagnoses of undescribed new species of mollusks in the collection of the United States National Museum. Proceedings of the United States National Museum 70(2668): 1-11

External links
 To Biodiversity Heritage Library (2 publications)
 To Encyclopedia of Life
 To GenBank (2 nucleotides; 0 proteins)
 To ITIS
 To World Register of Marine Species
 

 patagonica
Gastropods described in 1838